Luis de Mendoza may refer to:

 Luis de Mendoza (explorer), a member of Magellan's expedition
 Luis Hurtado de Mendoza, 2nd Marquess of Mondéjar, a Spanish nobleman